Jugo is the name for the Mediterranean wind that blows from the Sahara.

Jugo may also refer to:
Jugo bean, alternative name for the Bambara groundnut
Jugo (Naruto), an antagonist in the Japanese animated series Naruto
Jugo (poem), 1930s poem by Jakub Deml
Zastava Koral, subcompact Yugoslav car widely known as the Yugo, or in some markets, the Jugo

People with the family name Jugo include:
Jenny Jugo (1904–2001), Austrian film star
Bogs Jugo (born 1979), drummer in Philippine rock band Pupil
Amer Jugo (born 1982), Bosnian footballer

See also
Hugo (disambiguation)
Yugo (disambiguation)